Moustache (Half a Scissor) is the second full-length album by Mr. Oizo, the alias of producer/filmmaker Quentin Dupieux, released in 2005 on CD.

This was Dupieux's last release for F Communications, which infamously referred to it as "unlistenable" due to its extensive use of unusual time signatures and dissonant samples. His next two albums were released on the French label Ed Banger Records. The album was re-released by the American label Brainfeeder in 2011 on limited-edition vinyl.

The album's only single, "Stunt", did not chart.

Track listing
 "Untitled"
 "The End"
 "Latex"
 "Vagiclean 2"
 "Straw Anxious"
 "(E)"
 "Nurse Bob"
 "Berleef"
 "Scum Hotel"
 "Drop Urge Need Elle"
 "(EE)"
 "Stunt"
 "Moustache"
 "Half a Scissor"
 "1$44"
 "Square Surf"
 "Vagiclean"

Advanced Promo CDr  
 Nazis
 The End
 Moustache
 A Nun
 (e)
 I Was A Straw And I Was Anxious
 CPU
 Berleef
 Nurse Bob
 Half A Scissor
 (ee)
 Stunt
 Scum Hotel
 Drop Urge Need Elle
 1$44
 Vagiclean

References

2005 albums
Mr. Oizo albums